Feel Young is a monthly josei manga magazine published by Shodensha in Japan. Manga artists whose stories have run in this magazine include Moyoco Anno, Mitsue Aoki, Mitsukazu Mihara, Kiriko Nananan, Mari Okazaki, Erica Sakurazawa, Ebine Yamaji, and others.

Profile and relevance 
The magazine was first published in 1989. When the magazine emerged in the late 1980s, it was part of a new wave of josei magazines like Young Rose and Cutie Comics, publishing manga like the ones of Kyoko Okazaki that distanced themselves from the soap-opera "Ladies Comics" of the 1980s and kept more elements of shōjo manga in their style. Rachel Thorn explains that the magazine is considered more artsy and progressive than other josei magazines like the more conservative You or the more mainstream Chorus. Some women who got works published in the artistic manga magazine Garo, like Erica Sakurazawa, Kiriko Nananan and Shungicu Uchida, published their works also in Feel Young. The manga artist Milk Morizono described that she felt like her work was sometimes out of place, because it was too dark for the light pages of the magazine.

In 1995, it had a circulation of 250.000, in the following year 150.000. In 2004, an issue of the magazine had a circulation around 72.4000.

Serialized manga

1990s
The Rules of Love (1993–1994) by Erica Sakurazawa
IC in a Sunflower (1994–1997) by Mitsukazu Mihara
Nothing But Loving You (1994–1995) by Erica Sakurazawa
Helter Skelter (1995–1997) by Kyoko Okazaki
Happy Mania (1996–2001) by Moyoco Anno
Sayonara Midori-chan (1996–1997) by Kyūta Minami
Dolis (1998) by Maki Kusomoto
Doll (1998–2002) by Mitsukazu Mihara
Angel Nest (1999–2000) by Erica Sakurazawa

2000s
Love My Life (2000–2001) by Ebine Yamaji
The Embalmer (2002–2013) by Mitsukazu Mihara
New Hana no Asuka-gumi! (2003–2009) by Satosumi Takaguchi
Piece of Cake (2003–2008) by George Asakura 
Suppli (2003–2009) by Mari Okazaki
Bunny Drop (2005–2011) by Yumi Unita
Gozen 3-ji no Muhōchitai (2008–2009) by Yōko Nemu
Natsuyuki Rendezvous (2009–2012) by Haruka Kawachi
Her (2009–2010) by Tomoko Yamashita

2010s
Suppli Extra (2010) by Mari Okazaki
& (2010–2014) by Mari Okazaki
Chūgakusei Nikki (2013–present) by Junko Kawakami
Will I Be Single Forever? (2014–2015) by Mari Okazaki
Ghost of Undecimber (2015–2016) by Suzume Takano
Ii ne! Hikaru Genji-kun (2015–2021) by Est Em
Kashimashi Meshi (2016–present) by Mari Okazaki
Ikoku Nikki (2017–present) by Tomoko Yamashita
Kichijitsu Goyomi (2017–present) by Hisae Iwaoka
My Androgynous Boyfriend (2018–present) by Tamekō

2020s
Onna no Sono no Hoshi (2020–present) by Yama Wayama
Golden Raspberry (2020–present) by Aki Mochida

Notes

References

External links
  
 

1989 establishments in Japan
Josei manga magazines
Magazines established in 1989
Magazines published in Tokyo
Monthly manga magazines published in Japan
Shodensha